A diphthong, also known as a gliding vowel, is a combination of two adjacent vowel sounds within the same syllable. Technically, a diphthong is a vowel with two different targets: that is, the tongue (and/or other parts of the speech apparatus) moves during the pronunciation of the vowel. In most varieties of English, the phrase "no highway cowboy" has five distinct diphthongs, one in every syllable.

Diphthongs contrast with monophthongs, where the tongue or other speech organs do not move and the syllable contains only a single vowel sound. For instance, in English, the word ah is spoken as a monophthong, while the word ow is spoken as a diphthong in most varieties. Where two adjacent vowel sounds occur in different syllables (e.g. in the English word re-elect) the result is described as hiatus, not as a diphthong. (The English word hiatus is itself an example of both hiatus and diphthongs.)

Diphthongs often form when separate vowels are run together in rapid speech during a conversation. However, there are also unitary diphthongs, as in the English examples above, which are heard by listeners as single-vowel sounds (phonemes).

Transcription
In the International Phonetic Alphabet (IPA), monophthongs are transcribed with one symbol, as in English sun , in which  represents a monophthong.

Diphthongs may be transcribed with two vowel symbols or with a vowel symbol and a semivowel symbol.

Some transcriptions are broader or narrower (less precise or more precise phonetically) than others.

The non-syllabic diacritic, the inverted breve below , is placed under the less prominent part of a diphthong to show that it is part of a diphthong rather than a vowel in a separate syllable: . When there is no contrastive vowel sequence in the language, the diacritic may be omitted. The tie bar can be useful when it is not clear which symbol represents the syllable nucleus, or when they have equal weight. Superscripts are especially used when an on- or off-glide is particularly fleeting.

The period  is the opposite of the non-syllabic diacritic: it represents a syllable break. If two vowels next to each other belong to two different syllables (hiatus), meaning that they do not form a diphthong, they can be transcribed with two vowel symbols with a period in between. Thus, lower can be transcribed , with a period separating the first syllable, from the second syllable, .

The non-syllabic diacritic is used only when necessary. No words in English have the vowel sequences , so the non-syllabic diacritic is unnecessary.

Types

Falling and rising
(Sometimes, however, the terms "falling" and "rising" are used, instead, to refer to vowel height, i.e. as synonyms of the terms  "closing" and "opening". See below.) However, when the diphthong is analysed as a single phoneme, both elements are often transcribed with vowel symbols. Semivowels and approximants are not equivalent in all treatments, and in the English and Italian languages, among others, many phoneticians do not consider rising combinations to be diphthongs, but rather sequences of approximant and vowel. There are many languages (such as Romanian) that contrast one or more rising diphthongs with similar sequences of a glide and a vowel in their phonetic inventory (see semivowel for examples).

Closing, opening, and centering

In closing diphthongs, the second element is more close than the first (e.g. ); in opening diphthongs, the second element is more open (e.g. ). Closing diphthongs tend to be falling, and opening diphthongs are generally rising, as open vowels are more sonorous and therefore tend to be more prominent. However, exceptions to this rule are not rare in the world's languages.

A third, rare type of diphthong that is neither opening nor closing is height-harmonic diphthongs, with both elements at the same vowel height. These may have occurred in Old English:
 beorht  "bright"
 ċeald  "cold"

Many centering diphthongs are also opening diphthongs.

Diphthongs may contrast in how far they open or close. For example, Samoan contrasts low-to-mid with low-to-high diphthongs:
 ai  'probably'
 ae  'but'
 auro  'gold'
 ao  'a cloud'

Narrow and wide
Wide diphthongs are the opposite – they require a greater tongue movement, and their offsets are farther away from their starting points on the vowel chart.

Length
Languages differ in the length of diphthongs, measured in terms of morae.  In languages with phonemically short and long vowels, diphthongs typically behave like long vowels, and are pronounced with a similar length.  In languages with only one phonemic length for pure vowels, however, diphthongs may behave like pure vowels.  For example, in Icelandic, both monophthongs and diphthongs are pronounced long before single consonants and short before most consonant clusters.

Some languages contrast short and long diphthongs.  In some languages, such as Old English, these behave like short and long vowels, occupying one and two morae, respectively. Languages that contrast three quantities in diphthongs are extremely rare, but not unheard of; Northern Sami is known to contrast long, short and "finally stressed" diphthongs, the last of which are distinguished by a long second element.

Phonology
In some languages, diphthongs are single phonemes, while in others they are analyzed as sequences of two vowels, or of a vowel and a semivowel.

Sound changes
Certain sound changes relate to diphthongs and monophthongs. Vowel breaking or diphthongization is a vowel shift in which a monophthong becomes a diphthong. Monophthongization or smoothing is a vowel shift in which a diphthong becomes a monophthong.

Difference from semivowels and vowel sequences

While there are a number of similarities, diphthongs are not the same phonologically as a combination of a vowel and an approximant or glide. Most importantly, diphthongs are fully contained in the syllable nucleus while a semivowel or glide is restricted to the syllable boundaries (either the onset or the coda). This often manifests itself phonetically by a greater degree of constriction, but the phonetic distinction is not always clear. The English word yes, for example, consists of a palatal glide followed by a monophthong rather than a rising diphthong.

Diphthongs are also distinct from sequences of simple vowels. The Bunaq language of Timor, for example, distinguishes  'exit' from  'be amused',  'dance' from  'stare at', and  'choice' from  'good'.

Examples

Germanic languages

English

In words coming from Middle English, most cases of the Modern English diphthongs  originate from the Middle English long monophthongs  through the Great Vowel Shift, although some cases of  originate from the Middle English diphthongs .

Dutch

Afrikaans
The Afrikaans language has its origin in Dutch but differs in many significant ways, including the use of diphthongs in the place of several non-diphthong Dutch double vowels, or double-vowels being pronounced differently.
Examples include:ee as in leereu as in deurui as in buite

 Falling diphthongs. Their first element may be short  or somewhat lengthened .
 Rising diphthongs . These variants do not seem to appear word-finally.
 The scholar Daan Wissing argues that  is not a phonetically correct transcription and that  is more accurate.
 Most often,  has an unrounded offset. For some speakers, the onset is also unrounded.
  occur mainly in loanwords.
 Older sources describe  as a narrow back diphthong . However, newer sources describe its onset as more front.
That happens because Afrikaans  is more similar to the usual South African realization of English .

In diminutives ending in  formed to monosyllabic nouns, the vowels  are realised as closing diphthongs .

 In practice, the diphthong  is realised the same as the phonemic diphthong .
This means that puntjie 'point' sounds somewhat different than puintjie 'rubble'.

German

Standard German
Phonemic diphthongs in German:
 as in Ei 'egg'
 as in Maus 'mouse'
 as in neu 'new'

These are only phonetic diphthongs, not phonemic diphthongs, since the vocalic pronunciation  alternates with consonantal pronunciations of  if a vowel follows, cf. du hörst  'you hear' – ich höre  'I hear'. These phonetic diphthongs may be as follows:

 notes that the length contrast is not very stable before non-prevocalic  and that ", following the pronouncing dictionaries judge the vowel in Art, Schwert, Fahrt to be long, while the vowel in Ort, Furcht, hart is supposed to be short. He goes on stating that in his own dialect, there is no length difference in these words, and that judgements on vowel length in front of non-prevocalic  which is itself vocalized are problematic, in particular if  precedes.

Non-prevocalic  and  may also merge, but the vowel chart in  shows that they have somewhat different starting points.

 also states that "laxing of the vowel is predicted to take place in shortened vowels; it does indeed seem to go hand in hand with the vowel shortening in many cases."

Bernese German
The diphthongs of some German dialects differ from standard German diphthongs. The Bernese German diphthongs, for instance, correspond rather to the Middle High German diphthongs than to standard German diphthongs:
 as in lieb 'dear'
 as in guet 'good'
 as in müed 'tired'
 as in Bei 'leg'
 as in Boum 'tree'
 as in Böim 'trees'

Apart from these phonemic diphthongs, Bernese German has numerous phonetic diphthongs due to L-vocalization in the syllable coda, for instance the following ones:
 as in Stau 'stable'
 as in Staau 'steel'
 as in Wäut 'world'
 as in wääut 'elects'
 as in tschúud 'guilty'

 Yiddish 
Yiddish has three diphthongs:
 as in  פּליטה ('refugee' f.)
 as in  נײַן ('nine')
 as in  אופֿן ('way')

Diphthongs may reach a higher target position (towards ) in situations of coarticulatory phenomena or when words with such vowels are being emphasized.

Norwegian
There are five diphthongs in the Oslo dialect of Norwegian, all of them falling:

 as in nei, "no"
 as in øy, "island"
 as in sau, "sheep"
 as in hai, "shark"
 as in joik, "Sami song"

An additional diphthong, occurs only in the word hui in the expression i hui og hast "in great haste". The number and form of diphthongs vary between dialects.

Faroese
Diphthongs in Faroese are:
 as in bein (can also be short)
 as in havn as in har, mær as in hey as in nevnd as in nøvn as in hús as in mín, bý, ið (can also be short)
 as in ráð as in hoyra (can also be short)
 as in sól, ovnIcelandic
Diphthongs in Icelandic are the following:
 as in átta, "eight"
 as in nóg, "enough"
 as in auga, "eye"
 as in kær, "dear"
 as in þeir, "they"
 as in koja, "bunk bed", "berth" (rare, only in handful of words)

Combinations of semivowel  and a vowel are the following:
 as in éta, "eat"
 as in jata, "manger"
 as in já, "yes"
 as in joð, "iodine", "jay", "yod" (only in a handful of words of foreign origin)
 as in jól, "Christmas"
 as in jötunn, "giant"
 as in jæja, "oh well"
 as in jú, "yes"

Romance languages

French
In French,  and  may be considered true diphthongs (that is, fully contained in the syllable nucleus). Other sequences are considered part of a glide formation process that turns a high vowel into a semivowel (and part of the syllable onset) when followed by another vowel.

Diphthongs
   as in roi "king"
   as in groin "muzzle"
   as in huit "eight"
   as in juin "June"

Semivowels
  as in oui "yes"
  as in lien "bond"
  as in Ariège  as in pied "foot"
  as in yin  as in travail "work"
  as in Marseille  as in bille "ball"
  as in feuille "leaf"
  as in grenouille "frog"
  as in vieux "old"

Quebec French

In Quebec French, long vowels are generally diphthongized in informal speech when stressed.

  as in tard "late"
  as in père "father"
  as in fleur "flower"
  as in autre "other"
  as in neutre "neutral"
  as in banque "bank"
  as in mince "thin"
  as in bon "well"
  as in un "one"

Catalan

  in word initial position, e.g. iogurt.
 Both occur between vowels as in feia and veiem.

Diphthongization compensates for the loss of the palatal stop (part of Catalan's segment loss compensation). The dialectal distribution of this compensatory diphthongization is almost entirely dependent on the dorsal plosive (whether it is velar or palatal) and the extent of consonant assimilation (whether or not it is extended to palatals).

Portuguese

The Portuguese diphthongs are formed by the labio-velar approximant  and palatal approximant  with a vowel, European Portuguese has 14 phonemic diphthongs (10 oral and 4 nasal), all of which are falling diphthongs formed by a vowel and a nonsyllabic high vowel. Brazilian Portuguese has roughly the same amount, although the European and non-European dialects have slightly different pronunciations ( is a distinctive feature of some southern and central Portuguese dialects, especially that of Lisbon). Additionally, in casual speech, adjacent heterosyllabic vowels may combine into diphthongs and triphthongs or even sequences of them.

Spanish
Phonetically, Spanish has seven falling diphthongs and eight rising diphthongs.  In addition, during fast speech, sequences of vowels in hiatus become diphthongs wherein one becomes non-syllabic (unless they are the same vowel, in which case they fuse together) as in poeta  ('poet'), almohada  ('pillow'), maestro  ('teacher') and línea  ('line'). The Spanish diphthongs are:

Italian
The existence of true diphthongs in Italian is debated; however, a list is:

The second table includes only 'false' diphthongs, composed of a semivowel + a vowel, not two vowels. The situation is more nuanced in the first table: a word such as 'baita' is actually pronounced ['baj.ta] and most speakers would syllabify it that way. A word such as 'voi' would instead be pronounced and syllabified as ['vo.i], yet again without a diphthong.

In general, unstressed  in hiatus can turn into glides in more rapid speech (e.g. biennale  'biennial'; coalizione  'coalition') with the process occurring more readily in syllables further from stress.

Romanian

There are, however, a host of other vowel combinations (more than any other major Romance language) which are classified as vowel glides.

Celtic languages

Irish
All Irish diphthongs are falling.
, spelled aigh, aidh, agh, adh, eagh, eadh, eigh, or eidh, spelled abh, amh, eabh, or eamh, spelled ia, iai, spelled ua, uaiScottish Gaelic
There are 9 diphthongs in Scottish Gaelic.  Group 1 occur anywhere (eu is usually [eː] before -m, e.g. Seumas).  Group 2 are reflexes that occur before -ll, -m, -nn, -bh, -dh, -gh and -mh.

For more detailed explanations of Gaelic diphthongs see Scottish Gaelic orthography.

Cornish
The following diphthongs are used in the Standard Written Form of Cornish.  Each diphthong is given with its Revived Middle Cornish (RMC) and Revived Late Cornish (RLC) pronunciation.

Welsh
Welsh is traditionally divided into Northern and Southern dialects. In the north, some diphthongs may be short or long according to regular vowel length rules but in the south they are always short (see Welsh phonology). Southern dialects tend to simplify diphthongs in speech (e.g. gwaith  is reduced to ).

† The plural ending -au is reduced to /a/ in the north and /e/ in the south, e.g. cadau 'battles' is /ˈkada/ (north) or /ˈkade/ (south).

Slavic languages

Czech
There are three diphthongs in Czech:

 as in auto (almost exclusively in words of foreign origin)
 as in euro (in words of foreign origin only)

Serbo-Croatian
For example, in the first line of the national anthem of Croatia, Lijepa naša domovina, ije is pronounced as a diphthong, but in the first line of the national anthem of Montenegro, Oj, svijetla majska zoro, ije is pronounced as two syllables.

Some Serbo-Croatian dialects also have uo, as in  whereas, in Standard Croatian and Serbian, these words are konj, rod, on.

Finno-Ugric languages

Estonian

All nine vowels can appear as the first component of an Estonian diphthong, but only  occur as the second component.

Finnish

All Finnish diphthongs are falling. Notably, Finnish has true opening diphthongs (e.g. ), which are not very common crosslinguistically compared to centering diphthongs (e.g.  in English).
 closing
 as in laiva (ship)
 as in keinu (swing)
 as in poika (boy)
 as in äiti (mother)
 as in öisin (at nights)
 as in lauha (mild)
 as in leuto (mild)
 as in koulu (school)
 as in leyhyä (to waft)
 as in täysi (full)
 as in löytää (to find)
 close
 as in uida (to swim)
 as in lyijy (lead)
 as in viulu (violin)
 as in siistiytyä (to smarten up)
 opening
 as in kieli (tongue)
 as in suo (bog)
 as in yö (night)

Northern Sami
The diphthong system in Northern Sami varies considerably from one dialect to another. The Western Finnmark dialects distinguish four different qualities of opening diphthongs:

 as in leat "to be"
 as in giella "language"
 as in boahtit "to come"
 as in vuodjat "to swim"

In terms of quantity, Northern Sami shows a three-way contrast between long, short and finally stressed diphthongs. The last are distinguished from long and short diphthongs by a markedly long and stressed second component. Diphthong quantity is not indicated in spelling.

Semitic languages

Maltese
Maltese has seven falling diphthongs, though they may be considered VC sequences phonemically.

 ej or għi aj or għi oj iw ew aw or għu ow or għuSino-Tibetan languages

Mandarin Chinese
Rising sequences in Mandarin are usually regarded as a combination of a medial semivowel plus a vowel, while falling sequences are regarded as one diphthong.

ai: , as in ài (愛, love)
ei: , as in lèi (累, tired)
ao: , as in dào (道, way)
ou: , as in dòu (豆, bean)

Cantonese
Cantonese has eleven diphthongs.

aai: , as in gaai1 (街, street)
aau: , as in baau3 (爆, explode)
ai: , as in gai1 (雞, chicken)
au: , as in au1 (勾, hook)
ei: , as in gei1 (機, machine)
eu: , as in deu6 (掉, throw)
iu: , as in giu3 (叫, call)
oi: , as in oi3 (愛, love)
ou: , as in gou1 (高, high)
ui: , as in pui4 (陪, accompany)
eui: , as in zeoi3 (醉, drunk)

Tai–Kadai languages

 Thai 
 เอีย เอียะ ia 
 เอือ เอือะ üa 
 อัว อัวะ ua 

Mon-Khmer languages

Vietnamese
In addition to vowel nuclei following or preceding /j/ and /w/, Vietnamese has three diphthongs:
 ia~iê ưa~ươ ua~uôKhmer
Khmer language has rich vocalics with an extra distinction of long and short register to the vowels and diphthongs.

Bantu languages

 Zulu 

Zulu has only monophthongs. Y and w are semi-vowels:

 as in  ngiyakubeka (I am placing it)
 as in  ngiwa (I fall/I am falling)

Austronesian languages
Indonesian
Indonesian has four diphthongs which may be located at the beginning, middle or end of a word. They are:
 : balairung ('hall'), kedai ('shop'), pandai ('clever')
 : autodidak ('autodidact'), Taufik (Indonesian given name), kerbau ('buffalo'), limau ('lemon')
 : eigendom ('property'), survei''''' ('survey')

See also
 Digraph (orthography)
 Hiatus
 Index of phonetics articles
 Table of vowels
 Monophthong
 Semivowel
 Triphthong
 Vowel
 Vowel breaking
 Diaeresis

References

Bibliography
 
 

 
 
 

 

 
 
 

 

 

 
 
 
 
 
 
 
 
 
 
 

Vowels
Phonetics